The Crooked Billet is a 1929 British drama film directed by Adrian Brunel and starring Madeleine Carroll, Carlyle Blackwell and Miles Mander. It was released in both silent and sound versions, as its production came as the industry was shifting over.  It was made by Gainsborough Pictures at their Islington Studios.

It was one of the first films to use RCA's synchronized sound system for dialogue.

The plot has been summarized as: "An international spy searches for lost documents hidden in an old inn."

It is listed on the British Film Institute's 75 Most Wanted list of lost films. The fim surfaced in France in december 2021 but the BFI refused to pay the asking price, so the only known 16mm copy is owned by a French individual.

Cast
 Carlyle Blackwell – Dietrich Hebburn
 Madeleine Carroll – Joan Easton
 Miles Mander – Guy Morrow
 Gordon Harker – Slick
 Kim Peacock – Philip Easton
 Danny Green – Rogers
 Frank Goldsmith – Sir William Easton
 Alexander Field – Alf

Reprise
An identically titled film with a similar theme was released in 2017.  A sequel was released in 2018, and a third feature is planned.

References

External links

1929 films
1929 drama films
British drama films
Films directed by Adrian Brunel
Gainsborough Pictures films
Islington Studios films
Lost British films
British black-and-white films
1929 lost films
Lost drama films
1920s English-language films
1920s British films